Attilio Meucci is a statistician and financial engineer, who specializes in quantitative risk management and quantitative portfolio management.

Education 
Attilio Meucci earned a BA in Physics from the University of Milan, an MA in Economics from Bocconi University, and a PhD in Mathematics from the University of Milan.

Career 
Meucci was the chief risk officer at KKR; the chief risk officer and head of portfolio construction at Kepos Capital LP.; head of research at Bloomberg LP's portfolio analytics and risk platform; a researcher at POINT, Lehman Brothers' portfolio analytics and risk platform; a trader at the hedge fund Relative Value International; and a consultant at Bain & Co, a strategic consulting firm.

Meucci is the founder of ARPM, under whose umbrella he designed and teaches the six-day Advanced Risk and Portfolio Management Bootcamp (ARPM Bootcamp), and manages the charity One More Reason.

Bibliography

References

External links 
 ARPM
 Attilio Meucci's page on SSRN
 Attilio Meucci's page on MATLAB Central
 Attilio Meucci at the Math Genealogy Project

Living people
Year of birth missing (living people)
CFA charterholders
University of Milan alumni
Bayesian statisticians
Bocconi University alumni
Baruch College faculty
New York University faculty
Columbia University faculty
American statisticians